Mike or Michael Ritchie may refer to:

Michael Ritchie (filmmaker) (1938–2001), American director, producer and writer
Michael Ritchie (artistic director) (born 1957), American theatre manager
Mike Ritchie, New Zealand national decathlon champion in 1979
Mike Ritchie (born 1959), Scottish footballer in 2006 Scottish Challenge Cup Final
Michael G. Ritchie  (born 1962), Scottish evolutionary biologist
Michael Ritchie (shinty) (born 1972), Scottish goalkeeper